SkyJump Las Vegas holds the Guinness World Record for highest commercial decelerator descent with an official height of  and is located at The Strat. As part of its grand opening event, Las Vegas Mayor Oscar Goodman presented a written proclamation deeming April 20, 2010 as SkyJump Day in Las Vegas.

Ride experience 
SkyJump Las Vegas is a controlled decelerator descent. Riders of SkyJump Las Vegas are given a short safety lesson and suited up in a The Strat custom “jump suit”. The rider is then connected to a patented highspeed “descender” machine and led to the edge of a small platform where they will leap out and descend the Strat SkyPod. The effect is similar to bungee jumping. Guide wires keep riders from straying off course. Just prior to reaching the rapidly approaching ground, the machine slows the rider down, bringing them to a controlled landing.

See also
 Big Shot (ride)
 High Roller (Stratosphere)
 X-Scream

References

External links 
 
 Stratosphere Hotel & Casino

Tourist attractions in Las Vegas
Buildings and structures in Las Vegas